Stéphane-Georges Lepelletier de Bouhélier (Rueil 19 May 1876 – Montreux  20 December 1947) known as Saint-Georges de Bouhélier, was a French poet and dramatist.

He was the son of Edmond Lepelletier.

Works
Chant d'apothéose pour Victor Hugo (for the Hugo centenary) with music by Gustave Charpentier (1902)
adaption of Sophocles' Oedipus Rex, directed by Firmin Gémier at the Cirque d'Hiver in 1919, London 1920

References

1876 births
1947 deaths